Hottie may refer to: 
 A slang term for a physically attractive person
 A hot water bottle used to provide warmth 
 Hottie, nickname of Holly Holm, top-ranked female welterweight boxer
 "Hottie", a 2000 song by Take 5 on their album Against All Odds
 "Hottie", a 2001 song by Ashley Ballard 
 "Hottie", a song by Brockhampton from Saturation III